The Browning Buck Mark is a semi-automatic pistol, made by the Browning Arms Company and chambered for the .22 Long Rifle cartridge. It has been produced since 1985. The Buck Mark replaced both the Challenger and International pistol models.  The same action from the pistol is used in Buck Mark rifles.

Design details
The Buck Mark pistol is designed with a straight blowback action, and is crafted using 7075 aluminium alloy. The gun uses .22 Long Rifle ammunition, with a magazine holding ten rounds. The gun comes equipped with a thumb safety as well as front and rear iron sights. Some also include a fiber-optic front sight for increased visibility. Features for some models include a bull barrel, full length scope rail, wooden comfort grips, and Pachmayr grips. It is typically issued with a ten-round magazine. As of 2019, there are 23 models offered of the Browning Buck Mark pistol, 10 of them are available in California.

Models

UDX Frame 
 Plus UDX
 Plus Rosewood UDX
 Plus Stainless UDX

URX Frame 

 Camper Stainless URX
 Contour URX, 5-1/2"
 Contour URX, 7-1/4"
 Contour Stainless URX, 5-1/2"
 Contour Stainless URX, 7-1/4"
 Lite Gray URX 5-1/2"
 Lite Gray URX 7-1/4"
 Lite Green URX
 Practical URX
 Standard URX
 Standard Micro URX
 Standard Stainless URX

UFX Frame 
UFX frame lacks finger grooves, unlike URX and UDX frames.
 Black Flute Lite
 Camper UFX
 Camper Stainless UFX
 Challenge Rosewood
 Field Target
 Field Target Suppressor Ready
 Hunter

Limited Availability Models

UDX Frame 
 Black Label Carbon Fiber
 Black Label Carbon Fiber Pink

UFX Frame 
 Black Lite
 Buckthorn Pink
 Buckthorn Tan
 Camper Mossy Oak Bottomlands
 Plus Fuchsia
 Plus Stainless Fuchsia

Buck Mark Rifles 

Browning Buck Mark Rifle is a rimfire rifle based on Buck Mark pistol. It uses the same .22 Long Rifle ammunition and magazines as its pistol predecessor. All Buck Mark Rifles have 18" barrel.

Models 
 Sporter Rifle
 Target Rifle
 FLD Target Gray Laminate Rifle

References

External links 
 Buck Mark series pistols at browning.com
 Buck Mark Rifles at browning.com
 Browning Buck Mark Owners Manual

Semi-automatic pistols
.22 LR pistols